Hebron is an unincorporated town in Adair County, Iowa, United States.

History

Founded in the 1800s, Hebron was named after the ancient city of Hebron. Hebron is located in the southeastern part of Grand River Township, near the Grand River.

The Hebron Creamery operated in the community circa 1904. Other businesses included a general store, a barber shop, an ice house, a saw mill, and a blacksmith shop. A school, a post office, and the Hebron Methodist Church also operated in the community. The church is still in operation.

Hebron's population was 106 in 1902, and 66 in 1925.

References

Unincorporated communities in Adair County, Iowa
Unincorporated communities in Iowa